Mōrere is a sparsely populated area in New Zealand that is home to the Morere Hot Springs and Morere Springs Scenic Reserve with trails through nikau palm habitat. Morere is in the area of Hawkes Bay on the North Island. Self contained accommodation is available   nearby at Morere Hot Springs Lodge.

References

Populated places in the Hawke's Bay Region